Back Once Again is the six-track debut extended play by the Australian hip hop group, Hilltop Hoods. It was released as a 12" vinyl EP in 1997 and, as from September 2015, is rare. The title track contains a vocal sample from "Bring the Noise" by Public Enemy.

Hilltop Hoods formed in 1991 when Suffa (Matthew Lambert) and MC Pressure (Daniel Smith) met at Blackwood High School. DJ Next (Ben Hare) performed all of the Turntablist/DJ work for the group and regularly competed in the local DMC tournaments.

Hooded Puppets, a short-lived live instrumental group, comprising Chris Lambert (bass), Kenny Kreuper (drums) and Lee Moore (saxophone), contribute on two tracks on the EP. The Hooded Puppets performed alongside Hilltop Hoods at a number of their early performances.

Track listing

Side A / Southside

Side B / Flipside

Credits
 Engineer – Ben Hare, Daniel Smith
 Mastering – Neville Clark 
 Producer – Hilltop Hoods 
 Scratches – DJ Next

References 

Hilltop Hoods albums
1997 debut EPs